KMTL (760 kHz) is a commercial AM radio station licensed to Sherwood, Arkansas, and serving the Little Rock metropolitan area. The station is currently owned by the estate of George V. Domerese, and licensed to his son, Timothy Domerese, as administrator of the estate, pending a sale to Radio La Patrona, LLC.  It airs a Regional Mexican radio format.

KMTL is a daytimer.  760 AM is a clear-channel frequency, on which WJR in Detroit is the dominant Class A station.  KMTL is powered at 10,000 watts, using a non-directional antenna.  But it must leave the air from sunset to sunrise in order to protect the nighttime skywave signal of WJR.  The transmitter is off Tower Road in Sherwood.  Programming can be heard around the clock on FM translator station K249FE at 97.7 MHz in Sherwood.

History
KMTL was built and signed on in 1984 by the Sherwood Broadcasting Company, owned by the Shields family. In 1988, George V. Domerese bought KMTL. Under Domerese ownership, the station broadcast a gospel format. George V. Domerese died in 2017, leaving ownership of the station to his estate.

Heavy rainfall in 2018 knocked KMTL off the air as of March 1, and instead of returning it to air, the Domerese estate opted to sell. In August, the estate filed to sell KMTL to Radio La Patrona for $100,000. With the sale still pending, in order to retain its license, the station resumed operations under special temporary authority in late February 2019 with 1,000 watts.

References

External links
KMTL official website

Regional Mexican radio stations in the United States
MTL
Sherwood, Arkansas
Radio stations established in 1984
1984 establishments in Arkansas
MTL